A Walk in the Sun may refer to:

 A Walk in the Sun (1944), a novel by Harry Brown
 A Walk in the Sun (1945 film), a 1945 World War II war film adaptation of Harry Brown's novel
 "A Walk in the Sun", song and album by Earl Robinson, written for the 1945 film
 A Walk in the Sun (1978 film), a 1978 Swedish drama film 
 "A Walk in the Sun" (short story), a 1991  science fiction short story by Geoffrey A. Landis